Cameron van der Burgh  OIS (born 25 May 1988) is a retired South African competitive swimmer and hedge fund analyst. He is Africa's first home-trained world record holder and individual male Olympic Champion. He is married to long time partner Nefeli Valakelis.

Swimming career
Van der Burgh trains with Dirk Lange and is based in Pretoria. He has represented South Africa at the 2008 Summer Olympics, at the 2012 Summer Olympics where he won the gold medal in the 100-meter breaststroke in a new world record, and the 2016 Olympics. He has won numerous World Championship medals since his debut in 2007 when he took a bronze medal. Three times he has won the FINA overall World Cup.

Van der Burgh set his first world long-course record (27.06s) in the 50 m breaststroke in the semifinals at South African nationals in April 2009, cutting 0.12 of a second from Oleg Lisogor's old world record set in 2002. He won the world title in the same year at the Rome championship, also in the 50 m breaststroke.

He won the 50m breaststroke at the 2010 Commonwealth Games in a time of 27.18 seconds in a new games record and the 100m world title at the 2010 short course world championships. He won the 100m breaststroke gold medal at the 2012 Summer Olympics in a new world record time of 58.46 seconds, and paid tribute to late world champion Alexander Dale Oen afterwards. Van der Burgh later admitted to breaking the rules by utilising illegal dolphin kicks during the race which was confirmed by video replays showing Van der Burgh taking three dolphin kicks. Subsequently, FINA have suggested they may consider underwater video evidence to judge results, although van der Burgh's results and medal are not under threat.

At the 2014 Commonwealth Games, he won the gold in the men's 50 m breaststroke in a new games record.  He won silver in the 100 m breaststroke behind Adam Peaty, and was part of the South African team that won bronze in the men's 4 x 100 m relay. The 2014 Commonwealth Games marked the beginning of his major rivalry with World and Olympic champion Adam Peaty. Although Peaty has maintained the upper hand at Olympic and World level, especially in the 100 metres breaststroke, Van Der Burgh has remained his main international rival, and remains the only swimmer to have beaten him since his breakthrough, on both occasions denying Peaty the only major silverware missing from his collection, the Commonwealth Games 50 metre breaststroke title (a race not on the Olympic calendar).

In 2015 Cameron went on to Break the World Record in the heats of the 50m Breaststroke at the World Championships but settled for silver in the final. He went on further to earn another silver in the 100m Breaststroke. Later that year he went on to record a 24 race unbeaten streak to win the overall men's World Cup, the third of his career.

At the 2016 Olympic Games Cameron secured the silver medal in the 100m Breaststroke earning his second Olympic Medal. Later that year he went on the win another World Championship title at the World Short Cours championships in the 50m Breaststroke.

In December 2018, van der Burgh announced his retirement from competitive swimming following the conclusion of the 2018 FINA Short Course World Swimming Championships, where he won two individual gold medals.

Personal life
Van der Burgh went to Glenstantia Primary as a young boy but matriculated at Crawford College in 2006. He studied Financial Management through UNISA part-time and was interested in becoming an entrepreneur after his swimming career.  Since the London Olympics, van der Burgh has received various awards including South African Style Icon 2012, GQ 7th best-dressed man 2012, and has gone on to make various magazine covers and appeared in South African TV shows. He has made many appearances around the country giving motivational speeches and attending gala dinners. He has been linked to a few charities and recently fed underprivileged kids in Alexandria with his Olympic earnings. Most recently he has become the ambassador for Steps, a charity that treats kids born with clubfoot.

In March 2020, van der Burgh contracted COVID-19 during the worldwide coronavirus pandemic. He called it "by far the worst virus" he has ever endured, despite "being a healthy individual with strong lungs (no smoking/sport), living a healthy lifestyle and being young".

Sponsors
Following the 2012 Summer Olympics, van der Burgh received several sponsorships, including Arena, Investec, Audi, USN, and Tag Heuer, with his most recent being a four-year deal with multi-brand corporation Procter & Gamble as the new Head and Shoulders ambassador, joining the likes of Michael Phelps, Lionel Messi and Jenson Button.  He is estimated to be earning between $200,000 and $400,000 per year from sponsorship deals.

Investment career 
Van der Burgh created a big passion for the financial markets from a young age when he won the JSE School Challenge in 2005 and has gone to further manage a portion of his own capital ever since. He recently revealed he enjoys commodities in particular.

Cameron joined Andurand Capital, a hedge fund in London, as an analyst in 2018.

See also
List of Olympic medalists in swimming (men)
World record progression 50 metres breaststroke

References

External links
 BEST sports – Profile
 
 
 
 
 
 
 
 

1988 births
Living people
Sportspeople from Pretoria
Afrikaner people
University of Pretoria alumni
South African male swimmers
Male breaststroke swimmers
Olympic swimmers of South Africa
Olympic gold medalists for South Africa
Olympic silver medalists for South Africa
Olympic gold medalists in swimming
Olympic silver medalists in swimming
Swimmers at the 2008 Summer Olympics
Swimmers at the 2012 Summer Olympics
Swimmers at the 2016 Summer Olympics
Medalists at the 2012 Summer Olympics
Medalists at the 2016 Summer Olympics
Commonwealth Games medallists in swimming
Commonwealth Games gold medallists for South Africa
Swimmers at the 2010 Commonwealth Games
Swimmers at the 2014 Commonwealth Games
Swimmers at the 2018 Commonwealth Games
African Games medalists in swimming
African Games gold medalists for South Africa
Competitors at the 2007 All-Africa Games
Competitors at the 2011 All-Africa Games
Swimmers at the 2015 African Games
World record holders in swimming
World Aquatics Championships medalists in swimming
Medalists at the FINA World Swimming Championships (25 m)
Recipients of the Order of Ikhamanga
South African people of Dutch descent
Medallists at the 2010 Commonwealth Games
Medallists at the 2014 Commonwealth Games
Medallists at the 2018 Commonwealth Games